Sakari Rainer Puisto (born 19 December 1976 in Tampere) is a Finnish politician. He was a candidate of the Finns Party in European Parliament elections in 2014 and in parliamentary elections in 2015 and 2019. In spring 2015, he participated in the government negotiations. He worked as a Senior Adviser to former Minister of Employment Jari Lindström in the Ministry of Economic Affairs and Employment of Finland. During this time, he especially focused on the asylum seeker crisis as well as education and innovation policy, in addition to economic affairs and employment policy. In 2019, he was a candidate of the Finns Party in Pirkanmaa constituency and was elected to the Parliament.

In 1995, Puisto graduated from Sampo upper secondary school in Tampere. After his military service, he moved to Britain to study physical sciences in Cambridge University. In 2004, he obtained a Ph.D. degree from Cambridge University. After that, he worked for local companies in South China ‒ in Shenzhen and Hong Kong. Puisto has been a visiting scholar in Cambridge University.

In July 2021, Puisto has announced the opportunity to take over as the leader of the Finns Party after Jussi Halla-aho.

Memberships in committees 

 Constitutional Law Committee (member) 18 June 2019 –
 Foreign Affairs Committee (deputy member) 18 June 2019 –
 Commerce Committee (member) 18 June 2019 –
 Baltic Sea Parliamentary Conference (member) 19 June 2019 –, (Chair) 27 June 2019 –
 Forum for International Affairs (member) 27 June 2019 –
 The Board of the Finnish Institute of International Affairs (member) 1 January 2022 –
In addition, he is the Chair of the Finnish Parliamentary Friendship Group of Lithuania and the Friendship Group of Poland.

Elections

European Parliament elections 

 2014: 2,684 votes (not elected)

Parliamentary elections 

 2015: 2,762 votes (Pirkanmaa constituency; not elected)
 2019: 4,837 votes (Pirkanmaa constituency; elected)

Municipal elections 

 2017: 508 votes (Tampere; elected)
 2021: 1 431 votes (Tampere; elected)

Sources 

1976 births
Living people
Politicians from Tampere
Finns Party politicians
Members of the Parliament of Finland (2019–23)
Finnish expatriates in Hong Kong
Finnish expatriates in China